Mantua is a monotypic moth genus belonging to the subfamily Tortricinae of the family Tortricidae. The genus was first described by Elwood Zimmerman in 1978. Its only species, Mantua fulvosericea, was first described by Lord Walsingham in 1907. It is endemic to the Hawaiian islands of Kauai, Oahu, Molokai and Lanai.

The wingspan is 28–36 mm.

The larvae feed on Xylosma hawaiensis. They spin the leaves together.

See also
List of Tortricidae genera

References

External links
Tortricidae.com

Archipini
Endemic moths of Hawaii
Moths described in 1907
Taxa named by Thomas de Grey, 6th Baron Walsingham